Banaras railway station (station code: BSBS), formerly known as Manduadih railway station, is situated in Manduadih area of Varanasi in the Indian state of Uttar Pradesh. It is a major station of Varanasi. The new sign boards have the name of the station in Hindi, English, Urdu and also Sanskrit.
Due to heavy rush at Varanasi Junction, it has been developed as a high facilitated station.

History
The Prayagraj–Mau–Gorakhpur main line was constructed as a -wide metre-gauge line by the Bengal and North Western Railway between 1899 and 1913. It was opened as MG (metre-gauge) railway station in 1906. It is now, NSG-3 Class and Adarsh station.
It was converted to  broad gauge in 1993–94.

Station upgradation
Former union minister of state for railways Manoj Sinha took a keen interest in developing the railway station as one that is equipped with all possible facilities for passengers. Varanasi's Banaras railway station has been transformed completely. Banaras railway station is a world-class station which is termed as airport-style railway station in Indian Railways (IR) and indeed, a model railway station in IR. It is ISO: 2015 certified railway station with ISO: 9001 for Quality management system, ISO: 14001 for Environment management system and ISO: 18001 for Occupation health and safety management system. It has also achieved certification of 5 S for Work management system on 2 Oct 2019 by QFCI/Varanasi Chapter. It is NGT complied station.

The newly transformed station now has 8 platforms including a second entry PF, which is truly world-class. It has a spacious waiting area, circulating area, booking/reservation office, cafeteria, food court, waiting rooms and more. The station also has AC lounge, non-AC retiring rooms and dormitories. The railway station will also offer employment to local citizens. The architecture in the station premises reflects Kashi's faith. The station's surroundings contains fountains and seating area. The railway station is also equipped with stainless steel lounges and LED lights.

It is located in south-west zone of Varanasi City Municipal area, close to the famous Banaras Locomotive Works (700 metres) & Banaras Hindu University (3 km), and it  is well connected to most of the places within the city. Many trains in future will originate from Banaras railway station & it will de-congest the main rail station of Varanasi Metropolitan  - Varanasi Cantt. railway station, located in the cantonment area.

The Banaras Railway Station is one of the most advanced and facility-loaded railway stations in India. So much so that it can be qualified as an airport. Sprawling and neat platforms, food plazas, VIP lounges, escalators, green and lustrous gardens, and an advanced booking station are some of the facilities that make the station stand out.

Express trains originating from Banaras

Passenger trains originating from Banaras

See also
Varanasi Junction railway station
Varanasi City railway station
Pt. Deen Dayal Upadhyaya Junction railway station
Kashi railway station
Kerakat railway station

References

External links
 List of All Trains at Banaras Railway Station

Railway stations in Varanasi
Varanasi railway division